Edinburgh West may refer to:

 Edinburgh West (UK Parliament constituency), a constituency of the House of Commons of the Parliament of the United Kingdom, at Westminster
 Edinburgh West (Scottish Parliament constituency), a former constituency of the Scottish Parliament, at Holyrood